Anker may refer to:

People
Anker (name), people with the given name or surname
Anker (noble family)

Places
River Anker, in Warwickshire, England
Anker Site, an archaeological site in Illinois, US

Companies and brands
Anker (automobile), manufactured in Germany
Anker Innovations, a Chinese electronics brand producing computer and smartphone peripherals
Anker Beer, an Indonesian brand of pale lager

Measures
Anker, an archaic unit of volume used in the Netherlands
Anker (unit), a unit of capacity used in the US

See also
Anchor (disambiguation)
Ankers